The Electoral district of Kara Kara and Borung was an electoral district of the Victorian Legislative Assembly.

Members for Kara Kara and Borung

Election results

See also
 Parliaments of the Australian states and territories
 List of members of the Victorian Legislative Assembly

References

Former electoral districts of Victoria (Australia)
1927 establishments in Australia
1945 disestablishments in Australia